Halveh (also Romanized as Ḩalveh, Ḩalvāh, and Ḩelveh; also known as Halveh-ye Bozorg and Ḩelvā) is a village in Gheyzaniyeh Rural District, in the Central District of Ahvaz County, Khuzestan Province, Iran. At the 2006 census, its population was 44, in 6 families.

References 

Populated places in Ahvaz County